W63AU was an independent television station licensed to Pittsburgh, Pennsylvania. Its license was deleted on February 6, 2013.

References

External links

Television stations in Pittsburgh
Television channels and stations established in 1985
1985 establishments in Pennsylvania
Television channels and stations disestablished in 2013
2013 disestablishments in Pennsylvania
Defunct television stations in the United States
63AU